USS Dipper (AM-357) was an  built for the United States Navy during World War II. The ship was ordered and laid down as  USS PCE-917 but was renamed and reclassified before her July 1944 launch as Dipper (AM-357). Dipper was launched 26 July 1944 by Willamette Iron and Steel Works, Portland, Oregon ; sponsored by Miss A. L. Gaffney; and commissioned 26 December 1945. Dipper sailed from Portland 11 January 1946 to join the U.S. 19th Fleet (Reserve) at San Diego, California, four days later. She provided various services for this group until placed out of commission in reserve 15 January 1947. She was reclassified MSF-357, 7 February 1955. Dipper was sold for scrap on 5 January 1961.

References

External links 
 

PCE-905-class patrol craft
Admirable-class minesweepers
Ships built in Portland, Oregon
1944 ships
World War II patrol vessels of the United States
World War II minesweepers of the United States